Prestonwood Christian Academy (PCA) is a private Christian School that serves more than 1,600 students enrolled at three campuses: PCA Plano in Plano (Pre-Kindergarten 3 through 12th grade), PCA North in Prosper (Pre-Kindergarten 3 through 12th grade as of Fall 2022 (on May 20th, the Class of 2023 will have PCA North's first high school graduating class), and the PCA Online virtual academy.

It is affiliated with Prestonwood Baptist Church and is accredited by the Association of Christian Schools International. In addition to a spiritual development plan, the school follows a liberal arts academic program. 

PCA is both the name of the main campuses and the overall school system which it operates. In addition to PCA Plano, PCA North, and PCAplus, the system also includes St. Timothy Christian Academy, a K-12 school for students with learning challenges (St. Timothy is located at the Plano campus), and The King's Academy (TKA), a private school which began operations in Fall 2019 in the Bonton area of South Dallas with K4-1st grade. TKA intends to open a new grade every year thereafter.

Athletics
Prestonwood Christian Academy competes in the 6A classification (in football, 11-Man Division I) of the Texas Association of Private and Parochial Schools (TAPPS).

Volleyball, basketball, baseball and golf are also played by students at the school.

Notable alumni
 Anne Winters Emmy Award Winning actress
 Cole Missimo former midfielder for Philadelphia Union
 Julius Randle basketball player for New York Knicks
 J. R. Reed American football safety
 Cameron Rupp  American professional baseball catcher in the Oakland Athletics organization
 Matt Constant  Soccer Center Back for Michigan Stars FC

References

External links
 

Christian schools in Texas
High schools in Plano, Texas
Private K-12 schools in Texas
Prestonwood Baptist Church
Educational institutions established in 1997
1997 establishments in Texas